Paul Troje (21 January 1864 in Warnow (Güstrow) – 29 June 1942 in Einbeck) was a German politician and from 1893 to 1907 the mayor of Einbeck and from 24 August 1907 until 30 September 1924 mayor of Marburg.

References 

1864 births
1942 deaths
People from Rostock (district)
People from the Grand Duchy of Mecklenburg-Schwerin
Mayors of Marburg